Cyndia Sieden (born September 10, 1961) is an American coloratura soprano on the opera and concert stages.

Biography
Cyndia Sieden was born in 1961 in California, USA, and received her first vocal instruction there. A significant early milestone in her studies was work with Elisabeth Schwarzkopf in master classes in Carmel Valley, California in 1982. Schwarzkopf then invited Sieden to become her private student, and also to work with her in her master classes at the 1983 Salzburg Mozarteum. Sieden sang in the culminating concert/competition and won first place, which became the catalyst for her first professional engagements. In 1984, she made her European debut in the Ruth Berghaus production of The Barber of Seville (Silvio Varviso conducting) at the Bavarian State Opera; her American debut also took place in 1984, in La Fille du Regiment in Tampa, Florida.

Since then, she has moved among the Baroque, classical, romantic and modern/contemporary repertoire at most of the world’s great opera houses, including Munich's Bavarian State Opera, Paris's Opéra Bastille, Barcelona's Gran Teatre del Liceu, La Monnaie in Brussels, and London’s Royal Opera House and English National Opera, as well as in Beijing and Australia. Her Metropolitan Opera, debut was in the title role of Alban Berg's Lulu, and she returned there in 2008 for the Queen of the Night in Die Zauberflöte. With a great sympathy for the works of Richard Strauss, she often performs Zerbinetta in Ariadne auf Naxos (Munich, Japan, Vienna), Sophie in Der Rosenkavalier (Paris Châtelet) and Aminta in Die schweigsame Frau (Palermo).

On the concert platform Cyndia Sieden has appeared with most major European and North American orchestras; Sieden often sings Carl Orff's Carmina Burana, the oratorios of Handel, Mozart, and Haydn, and works of Johann Sebastian Bach and Gustav Mahler. Among her collaborators have been Christoph Eschenbach, John Eliot Gardiner, Nikolaus Harnoncourt, James Levine, Nicholas McGegan, Roger Norrington, Wolfgang Sawallisch, Pinchas Steinberg and Esa-Pekka Salonen.

Challenging contemporary roles have been a hallmark of her career, including the high-flying and athletic role of Ariel in the premiere of Thomas Adès's The Tempest at the Royal Opera House Covent Garden. She repeated the role at the Frankfurt Opera in 2014. 2011 appearances in contemporary opera includes Morton Feldman's monodrama Neither for New York City Opera and Ariadne – Soprano I in Wolfgang Rihm's Dionysos at The Netherlands Opera.

Sieden divides her time between homes in Europe and the state of Washington, USA.

Selected discography
 Mozart: Die Zauberflöte

Label: Archiv Produktion (DG)
Composer: Wolfgang Amadeus Mozart
Performers: Gardiner, Oelze, Schade, Sieden
Conductor: John Eliot Gardiner
Orchestra/Ensemble: English Baroque Soloists, Monteverdi Choir

 Mozart: Die Entführung aus dem Serail

Label: Archiv Produktion (DG)
Composer: Wolfgang Amadeus Mozart
Performers: Olsen, Orgonasova, Sieden, Peper
Conductor: John Eliot Gardiner
Orchestra/Ensemble: English Baroque Soloists, Monteverdi Choir

 Mozart: Arias For Aloysia Weber

Label: Glossa
Composer: Wolfgang Amadeus Mozart
Performer: Cyndia Sieden
Conductor: Frans Brüggen
Orchestra/Ensemble: Orchestra of the 18th Century

 Schweitzer: Alceste

Label: Berlin Classics
Composer: Anton Schweitzer
Performers: Hofstetter, Genz, Schneider, Sieden
Conductor: Michael Hofstetter
Orchestra/Ensemble: Concerto Cologne

 Mozart: Mitridate, re di Ponto

Label: Orfeo
Composer: Wolfgang Amadeus Mozart
Performers: Ford, Sieden, Oelze
Conductor: Roger Norrington
Orchestra/Ensemble: Camerata Salzburg

 Mozart: Der Schauspieldirektor

Label: Telarc
Composer: Wolfgang Amadeus Mozart
Performers: Pearlman, Aler, Sieden
Conductor: Martin Pearlman
Orchestra/Ensemble: Boston Baroque

 Gluck: Orfeo ed Euridice

Label: Philips
Composer: Christoph W. Gluck
Performers: Ragin, McNair, Sieden
Conductor: John Eliot Gardiner
Orchestra/Ensemble: English Baroque Soloists

 Strauss: Die Frau ohne Schatten

Label: EMI Angel
Composer: Richard Strauss
Performers: Kollo, Studer, Schwarz, Vinzing, Muff, Sieden
Conductor: Wolfgang Sawallisch
Orchestra: Symphonie-Orchester des Bayerischen Rundfunks

 Strauss: Die schweigsame Frau

Label: Koch
Composer: Richard Strauss
Performers: Kurt Moll, Van Der Walt, Sieden
Conductor: Pinchas Steinberg
Orchestra: Munich Radio Orchestra

Sources
 NY Times Review, 3/2011
 LA Philharmonic bio
 Washington Post review 3/27/2011
 Classical Review article 3/2011
 KDHX review of St. Louis Symphony concert, 5/6/2011
 Bach-Cantatas online bio

External links
 Personal Site
 USA Management Site
 European Management Site
 Netherlands Opera

American operatic sopranos
Living people
1961 births
Singers from California
Classical musicians from California
20th-century American women opera singers
21st-century American women opera singers